GraphExeter is a material consisting of a few graphene sheets with a layer of ferric chloride molecules in between each graphene sheet. It was created by The Centre for Graphene Science at the University of Exeter in collaboration with the University of Bath.

See also
Carbon nanotubes
Graphene nanoribbons
Graphene oxide paper

References

External links
 The Centre for Graphene Science, Universities of Exeter

Aromatic compounds
Graphene
Semiconductor materials
Emerging technologies